The return to Zion is an event recorded in Ezra–Nehemiah of the Hebrew Bible, in which the Jews of the Kingdom of Judah—subjugated by the Neo-Babylonian Empire—were freed from the Babylonian captivity following the Persian conquest of Babylon. After their release, the Persian king Cyrus the Great issued a proclamation known as the Edict of Cyrus that enabled the freed Jewish populace, exiled from Judah, to return to Jerusalem and the Land of Judah, which had begun to function as a self-governing Jewish province under the Achaemenid Persian Empire.

Babylonian exile
The Neo-Babylonian Empire under the rule of Nebuchadnezzar II occupied the Kingdom of Judah between 597–586 BCE. The Babylonian army had destroyed the First Temple in Jerusalem. According to the Hebrew Bible, the king of Judah, Zedekiah, was forced to watch his own two sons being slaughtered, and thereafter, his own eyes were put out and he was exiled to Babylon (2 Kings 25).

The return to Zion

According to the books of Ezra–Nehemiah, a number of decades later in 538 BCE, the Jews in Babylon were allowed to return to the Land of Judah, due to Cyrus's decree. Initially, around 50,000 Jews returned to the Land of Judah following the decree of Cyrus as described in Ezra, whereas most remained in Babylon. Later, an unknown number of exiles returned from Babylon with Ezra himself. The return of the deportees to Judah during the next 110 years is known as the return to Zion, an event by which Jews ever since have been inspired.

Yehud Medinata

The returnees settled in what became known as Yehud Medinata or Yehud. Yehud Medinata was a self-governing Jewish province under the rule of the Achaemenid Empire which even issued their own Yehud coinage inscribed with the three letters Y-H-D.

Biblical account
According to the books of Ezra–Nehemiah in the Hebrew Bible, the return to Zion occurred in several waves: those of Sheshbazzar, Zerubbabel, Ezra and Nehemiah.

Sheshbazzar's return

The Book of Ezra first depicts the return of Sheshbazzar at the consent and encouragement of the Persian King Cyrus:

Zerubbabel's return 
The second migration recounted in the Book of Ezra is that of Zerubbabel and included 42,360 people, not including servants or handmaids. Among them, there were 24,144 ordinary men (57.12%) and 12,452 women and children (29.46%). There were also 4,289 priests (10.15%), 74 generic Levites (0.18%), 128 Singers (0.3%), 139 Gatekeepers (0.33%) (Singers and gatekeepers were specific roles of Levites in the holy temple in Jerusalem that had been passed from one generation to another), 392 Nethinim (0.93%), and 652 people who could not tell their fathers' houses and their ancestry (1.54%). 90 other people (0.21%) appear to have joined in, to complete that count of 42,360. In addition 7,337 servants and handmaids joined in, boosting the population to 49,697. They also brought up their working animals: 736 horses (one for about every 68 people), 246 mules (one for every 202 people), 435 camels (one per 114 people), and 6,720 donkeys (one for every 7 people).

Ezra's return
The third migration was led by Ezra the scribe, with the Talmud mentioning that Ezra was delayed in returning to the Land of Judah because he had to stay alongside his Rabbi, Baruch ben Neriah, a disciple of Jeremiah and one of the leading figures among Jews, but too old and weak to travel to the Land of Judah.

Ezra returned with the official approval of the Persian government and license to take out all donated money from exiled Jews and government officials to the holy temple and Jews living in Judea. He was also permitted to transfer holy vessels to the Temple in Jerusalem, and a decree was given to the government treasurers to allocate them with money, wheat, wine and oil. In addition, all which served in the holy temple, the priests, Levites and Nethinims were given tax exemption, and Ezra was authorized to appoint magistrates and judges and to teach the law of God to the people of Judah, as well as the authority to impose penalties of confiscation, banishment or execution, if needed.

Nehemiah's return
The fourth migration was led by Nehemiah, who requested a temporary leave of absence to go to Judah in order to rebuild Jerusalem and repair its city walls and his request was approved by the king. For this purpose, he was given permission to cut down woods and was escorted by the army.

Due to the economic distress that the people of Judea were under, Nehemiah faced a public crisis during the repairing of the walls of Jerusalem. Nehemiah heard the Jewish people's complaints and got angry at the Jewish nobles and officials for taking advantage of the crisis to make money off the poor Jews, especially those serving in the holy temple that were tax exempt, whereas the rest of the people of Judea were feeling the economic burden of heavy taxes by the Persian government. Nehemiah assembled a public hearing and contended with the nobles of Judah. He urged them to restore to the poor their fields and houses and relinquish their loans, and in order to set a personal example, he was the first to follow his own steps, proclaiming that he and his close associates would forgo their debts. He managed to get their assurances on this matter, but did not settle with their assurances and put them under oath that they should do according to this promise. On the twenty-fifth day of the month of Elul, 52 days after the work began, the whole wall was completed.

Cyrus cylinder

The biblical Book of Ezra includes two texts said to be decrees of Cyrus the Great allowing the deported Jews to return to their homeland after decades and ordering the Temple rebuilt. The differences in content and tone of the two decrees, one in Hebrew and one in Aramaic, have caused some scholars to question their authenticity. The Cyrus Cylinder, an ancient tablet on which is written a declaration in the name of Cyrus referring to restoration of temples and repatriation of exiled peoples, has often been taken as corroboration of the authenticity of the biblical decrees attributed to Cyrus, but other scholars point out that the cylinder's text is specific to Babylon and Mesopotamia and makes no mention of Judah or Jerusalem. Professor Lester L Grabbe asserted that the "alleged decree of Cyrus" regarding Judah, "cannot be considered authentic", but that there was a "general policy of allowing deportees to return and to re-establish cult sites". He also stated that archaeology suggests that the return was a "trickle" taking place over decades, rather than a single event.

In the diaspora 
In the middle of the 5th century BCE, the exiled Judean communities experienced a significant national awakening. It has been demonstrated that the Judean residents of Nippur, the majority of whom had names of Babylonian origin, suddenly began giving their children Judean theophoric names.

See also
 Gathering of Israel
 History of ancient Israel and Judah
 History of Zionism
 Jewish diaspora
 Persian Jews
 Pre-Modern Aliyah
 Proto-Zionism
 Shavei Zion (a  Moshav of cooperative agricultural community)
 Yehud (today a city in Israel)
 Yom HaAliyah

References

 
Land of Israel
Ezra–Nehemiah
Cyrus the Great
Babylonian captivity